Sivenathi Nontshinga (born 3 December 1998) is a South African professional boxer. He is the current IBF light-flyweight world champion, having held the belt since September 2022. He has previously held the IBF International light-flyweight title from 2019 to 2022. Also a former African light-flyweight champion, he is ranked as the world's sixth-best active light-flyweight by BoxRec and the seventh-best by the IBF.

Early life
Nontshinga was raised in Newlands, a "chicken farm community" located at the entrance to Mdantsane township in Eastern Cape. His father, Thembani Gopheni, is his trainer and his handler.

Professional boxing career

Early career
Nontshinga made his professional debut on 30 July 2017 at the age of 18, defeating Sandile Wessels in a third-round finish in East London. After four stoppages in his first four fights, he was soon recognized as a promising teen sensation in South Africa. In only his fifth pro fight, he defeated Tisetso Modisadife for the vacant African light-flyweight title.

On 7 April 2019, he scored a first-round knockout over Adam Yahaya to win the vacant IBF International light-flyweight title in Port Elizabeth. In his first title defense, Nontshinga defeated compatriot Siyabonga Siyo, a fighter he idolised growing up. He finished Siyo with a barrage of blows in the ninth round to make it eighth stoppage wins in eighth fights. He retained his belt again on 8 March 2020 by defeating Ivan Soriano, ranked number 5 by the IBF, at the Orient Theatre in East London. Nontshinga suffered a swollen left eye early, but after knocking him down at the end of the fourth round, he dropped the veteran for good in the fifth with a right cross.

After more than a year without a fight due to the COVID-19 pandemic, Nontshinga defeated Filipino prospect Christian Araneta in an IBF title eliminator in Port Elizabeth on 24 April 2021. Although he was knocked down in the 12th round, he was favored unanimously on the judges' scorecards (115–112, 114–113, 114–113).

IBF light flyweight champion

Nontshinga vs. Flores
Nontshinga faced the undefeated Hector Flores for the vacant IBF light flyweight title on 3 September 2022, following a seventeen-month absence from the sport, at the Centro de Usos Múltiples in Hermosillo, Mexico and was as such his first fight outside of his native South Africa. The bout was scheduled for the undercard of the Juan Francisco Estrada and Argi Cortes super flyweight title bout. Nontshinga won the fight by split decision. Two of the judges scored the fight 116–111 and 114–113 in his favor, while the third judge scored it 115–112 for Flores. Nontshinga scored the sole knockdown of the fight in the second round, as he floored his opponent with a right hook which looped around the guard. The newly crowned Nontshinga signed a promotional deal with Matchroom Boxing four days after capturing the vacant belt.

Nontshinga vs. Suganob
On February 28, 2023, Nontshinga was ordered by the IBF to make a mandatory title defense against Regie Suganob.

Professional boxing record

See also
List of world light-flyweight boxing champions

References

External links

|-

|-

|-

1998 births
Living people
South African male boxers
Sportspeople from the Eastern Cape
People from Buffalo City Metropolitan Municipality
World light-flyweight boxing champions
African Boxing Union champions
International Boxing Federation champions